Düzbağ is a town in Kahramanmaraş Province, Turkey

Geography 

Düzbağ is in the rural area of Çağlayancerit which is a part of Kahramanmaraş Province. The town is situated at the southern foothill of a mountain. The population was 6,032 in 2009.

History 

No record survives from the 15th century when the settlement was a part of Dulkadirids. The settlement was annexed by the Ottoman Empire during the reign of Selim I in 1517.  According to a census soon after the annexation, the name of the village was shown as Helete and the population of Helete was found out to be 200. In 1968 the village was declared a township named Düzbağ.

Economy 
The traditional economic activity is animal husbandry. The main agricultural crops are fruits, especially grapes and apples. There is also a small carpet weaving factory. Since the 1960s Düzbağ residents who migrated to Germany as industrial workers (gastarbeiter) have also contributed to the town's economy.

References 

Populated places in Kahramanmaraş Province
Towns in Turkey
Çağlayancerit District